Fangs of the Wild is a 1954 American adventure western film directed by William F. Claxton starring Onslow Stevens, Margia Dean, Freddy Ridgeway, Phil Tead, Robert Stevenson and Charles Chaplin Jr. It was produced and distributed as a second feature by Lippert Pictures.

Plot
A boy sees a murder at his father's (Onslow Stevens) lodge, but the killer (Charles Chaplin Jr.) calls it a hunting accident.

Cast
 Onslow Stevens as Jim Summers
 Margia Dean as Linda Wharton
 Freddy Ridgeway as Tad Summers
 Phil Tead as Mac
 Robert Stevenson as Deputy Sheriff Ridgeway 
 Charles Chaplin Jr. as Roger Wharton
 Buck as Shep

References

Bibliography
 Pitts, Michael R. Western Movies: A Guide to 5,105 Feature Films. McFarland, 2012.

External links

Fangs of the Wild at TCMDB
Fangs of the Wild at BFI

1954 films
American thriller films
1950s English-language films
Films scored by Paul Dunlap
1950s thriller films
Lippert Pictures films
Films directed by William F. Claxton
American black-and-white films
1950s American films